Generalized Music Plug-in Interface (GMPI) is a working group of the MIDI Manufacturers Association set up to consider the feasibility of a standard interface for audio and MIDI software plug-ins, to complement or supersede existing vendor-specific interfaces such as Audio Units.

The GMPI group started work in 2003 and published a requirements draft in April 2005. Progress has since stalled.

Jeff McClintock developed an implementation of GMPI for Microsoft Windows and Mac OS X, which is available as the SynthEdit Software Development Kit.

See also
VST
Audio Units
LV2
DirectX Media Objects
LADSPA
DSSI

External links
GMPI Requirements final draft
GMPI Mailing list
MMA Working Groups

References 

Application programming interfaces
Music software plugin architectures